The New Zealand Open  is a darts tournament organized by the New Zealand Darts Council that has been held since 1981.

List of tournaments

Men's

Women's

References

External links
Official Body:New Zealand Darts Council
http://www.dartsdatabase.co.uk/New Zealand Open Winners

Darts tournaments
Sports competitions in New Zealand
1975 establishments in New Zealand
Recurring sporting events established in 1975